Sant'Ambrogio ad Nemus is a Baroque style, Roman Catholic convent in Milan, Italy. The convent is no longer functioning, but the oratory or church remains.

While the present church dates to a reconstruction begun in 1635, the site was associated with the founding of monasticism by Saint Ambrose. The term ad Nemus referred to a forest outside of the medieval walls. The walls were frescoed in the 17th century. Above the entrance of the church are frescoes by the painter Cocchi.

The young boy Carlo Acutis made his first Holy Communion in this church at the early age of 7 years in 1998. He died at the age of fifteen and was beatified in 2020.

References

17th-century Roman Catholic church buildings in Italy
Roman Catholic churches in Milan
Baroque architecture in Milan